Elizabeth Anne Yarnold, OBE (born 31 October 1988) is a British former skeleton racer who joined the Great Britain national squad in 2010. With consecutive Olympic gold medals in 2014 and 2018, she is the most successful British Winter Olympian and the most successful Olympic skeleton athlete of all time from any nation. She won the 2013–14 Skeleton World Cup (only once finishing off the podium the whole season), followed by a gold in the 2014 Winter Olympics in Sochi. Yarnold was selected to be one of the two women skeleton drivers representing Team GB at the 2018 Winter Olympics in Pyeongchang, and went on to become the first person to defend an Olympic gold in skeleton and the first British athlete to defend a Winter Olympic title. Yarnold set the track record for women's skeleton at the Olympic venue in the final heat of the race with a time of 51.46 seconds, beating Jacqueline Lölling's pre-Olympic record by nearly 1.3 seconds and her own first-heat record by 0.2 second. Yarnold was also the flag bearer for Great Britain at the Pyeongchang opening ceremony.

Early life and education

Born in Sevenoaks, Kent, Yarnold was educated at St Michael's Preparatory School, an independent school in the village of Otford, Kent, followed by Maidstone Grammar School for Girls in the Kent county town of Maidstone, where she became Head Girl. After undertaking UCAS clearing following her A Levels, Yarnold chose to study geography and sport and exercise science at the University of Gloucestershire.

Personal life
Since taking up the skeleton sled, Yarnold has lived in Bath, Somerset, initially in a flat owned by former skeleton athlete and Olympic gold medallist in the 2010 Winter Olympics, Amy Williams. In 2018 she tweeted that Portsmouth was home.

On 1 May 2016, Yarnold married engineer James Roche, who co-designed Yarnold's sled while working for McLaren Applied Technologies.

Introduction to skeleton
Yarnold was initially a heptathlete; she was inspired to take up the sport after watching Denise Lewis at the 2000 Sydney Olympics.

In 2008, Yarnold took part in UK Sport's Girls4Gold talent search scheme. Initially she thought she would be suitable for a sport involving horses, but UK Sport identified skeleton as a good option. She began competing in 2010, winning her first official race in the Europa Cup at Igls in November. The next day she had her second win.

In subsequent seasons Yarnold honed her skeleton-racing skills, learned courses, and achieved the athletic performance required to compete at World Cup level. She finished the 2011/12 season in 9th position and became junior World Champion and a bronze medallist in the senior World Championships in 2012.

Her sled is named Mervyn after a former colleague of hers, Mervyn Sugden.

2013/14 season
From the first world cup practice run of the Olympic season it was apparent that Yarnold had found a new level of competitiveness, consistently topping timing sheets. She won the opening race in Calgary in controversial circumstances when US athlete Noelle Pikus-Pace was disqualified for a technical infringement. This set the scene for a season-long duel with Pikus-Pace. Yarnold eventually secured the World Cup Championship at the last race of the season in Königssee and the Olympic gold medal at the Sochi 2014 Winter Olympics, ahead of Pikus-Pace by 0.97 seconds. The Olympic performance was remarkable as she had the fastest run of each of the four runs and set new track records on her first and third runs. Yarnold's gold was the tenth gold medal ever achieved by British athletes in 90 years of Winter Olympics competition. It also ensured that Great Britain had won a medal in the Women's Skeleton in every Winter Olympics since the event was introduced.

Yarnold was appointed Member of the Order of the British Empire (MBE) in the 2014 Birthday Honours for services to skeleton racing.

2014/15 season
Following her success in the Olympics and World Cup, Yarnold completed a career grand slam in 2014/15 by becoming European Champion in February 2015 and World Champion the following month. She broke the track record at Winterberg twice in the course of her World Championship victory. She finished as runner-up to Janine Flock in that season's World Cup standings, winning five World Cup races and being defeated by a narrow margin of 20 points after missing the Calgary round of the series for health reasons.

In September 2015, Yarnold announced that she would take a year-long break and miss the 2015/16 skeleton season due to burnout.

2016/17 season
After a year out of competition, Yarnold finished fourth on her return at Whistler in December 2016. In the World Championships held at Königssee in February 2017, Yarnold won the bronze medal. She finished the year seventh in the IBSF rankings and ninth in the World Cup.

2017/18 season
Having suffered from dizzy spells for several years, in September 2017 Yarnold disclosed that she had been diagnosed with a vestibular disorder affecting the inner ear. After a relatively poor season, she successfully defended her Olympic title at the 2018 Games in Pyongchang, despite suffering from a number of health problems: upon arriving in South Korea for the Games she developed a chest infection, which worsened to the point that she was having trouble speaking and breathing, and on the first day of competition she suffered from dizziness due to a flare-up of her vestibular condition. She took the lead with a new track record on the first run: despite this she subsequently admitted that she was on the verge of pulling out of the competition due to her health problems. Dropping down to third place after the second run, albeit just a tenth of a second behind overnight leader Jacqueline Lölling, her health improved for the second day, and she subsequently moved up to second after the third run, two hundredths of a second behind new leader Janine Flock. On the final run she set another track record to clinch the gold by almost half a second. She subsequently stated that she considers her second Olympic gold to be her greatest achievement.

Post-Pyeongchang activities and retirement
Just weeks after the 2018 Olympics, Yarnold underwent knee surgery to remove a tumour in her knee which had been discovered six months before the Games. Following this, her use of crutches worsened the back pain that she had suffered for several years, which was diagnosed as being the result of a displaced disc, resulting in her being prescribed powerful painkillers for several months afterward. She subsequently underwent a successful operation on her back in July 2018.

Despite stating in September 2018 that she was planning to return to training, she announced her retirement from competition the following month. She acts as a mentor to young athletes and works for the British Olympic Association's athlete commission.

IBSF rankings
Yarnold has ranked on the International Bobsleigh and Skeleton Federation (IBSF) rankings since the 2010–11 season.

 2010–11 35th
 2011–12 9th
 2012–13 6th
 2013–14 1st
 2014–15 1st
 2015–16 -
 2016–17 7th
 2017-18 12th

World Cup results

Overall standings

Race victories

References

External links
 
 
 
 

1988 births
Living people
English female skeleton racers
Medalists at the 2014 Winter Olympics
Medalists at the 2018 Winter Olympics
Olympic gold medallists for Great Britain
Olympic medalists in skeleton
Olympic skeleton racers of Great Britain
Place of birth missing (living people)
People from Sevenoaks
Skeleton racers at the 2014 Winter Olympics
Skeleton racers at the 2018 Winter Olympics
Sportspeople from Kent
Alumni of the University of Gloucestershire
Officers of the Order of the British Empire
Team Bath winter athletes